PASARS-16 (Serbian: ПАСАРС-16) is a Serbian mobile hybrid short range air defence system intended for the protection of infantry, armoured mechanized and artillery-missile units from low flying aircraft, cruise missiles, unmanned aerial vehicles and other projectiles. Based on the FAP 2026BS/AV six-wheel drive general purpose off-road military chassis, the armoured rotary turret mounted at the rear of the vehicle is armed with a single barrel Bofors 40 mm anti-aircraft gun and one or more surface-to-air missiles linked to a modernized M85 Žirafa radar.

Development 
PASARS-16 is designed by the Military Technical Institute. Serial production started in 2019, with armoured turret being constructed by Zastava TERVO, hydraulics and integration of the armaments being done by FAP and PPT Namenska, and final assembly being carried out by Srboauto.

Gun 
The PASARS-16 main armament is the Bofors 40 mm anti-aircraft autocannon. Designed in the 1930s by the Swedish arms manufacturer Bofors, during the 1970s Serbian arms manufacturer Zastava Arms acquired a license from Bofors to produce the L/70 version. Ammunition for the autocannon is produced by Serbian company Sloboda. In 2020 a new programmable airburst ammunition containing 1100 tungsten pellets was reportedly developed for use by the PASARS-16. The PASARS has been spotted with a laser rangefinder and day/night sighting system.

Missiles

Mistral 

Total of 18 sets with 50 French Mistral 3 missiles were procured by the Serbian Armed Forces in 2021 and planned to be integrated on PASARS-16.

RLN-1C and RLN-1C/170 

The PASARS-16 uses RLN-1C missiles i.e. modified Vympel K-13 (R-13M) short-range, infrared homing air-to-air missile. Modifications by the Military Technical Institute were made to improve the rocket's propulsion block, in order to effectively launch the missile from the ground along with integration of a more powerful warhead with a modern proximity fuse and a modernized infrared homing system that directs the missile to the target.

9K38 Igla

Operators 
  Serbia: 18 in service with the Serbian Army.

References

External links

"Giraffe" radar and "PASARS-16" Demonstration Video - Serbian Ministry of Defence (2020)
PASARS-16 3P Product Demonstration - Serbian Ministry of Defence (2020) 
Military vehicles introduced in the 2010s
Self-propelled anti-aircraft weapons of Serbia
Self-propelled anti-aircraft weapons
40 mm artillery
Military Technical Institute Belgrade